Yvan Daumas (1943 – 13 April 2021) was a French expressionist painter.

Biography
He later taught at the same school. In 1990, he directed a short film as part of his series "portrait sans paroles". In 1997, he illustrated the book Passant obstiné, written by Yves Broussard.

Yvan Daumas died on 13 April 2021.

References

1943 births
2021 deaths
20th-century French painters
Artists from Marseille
21st-century French painters